Dying, in Other Words is the debut novel of English author Maggie Gee, variously described as surrealist and modern gothic. It garnered "rave reviews" in The Observer and The Times.  According to the OUP's Good Fiction Guide, a "vividly written experimental novel" it made a "strong impression" when it was published in 1981. Containing "postmodernist gimmicks" and self-refexive structures it concerns a supposedly dead woman rewriting the story of her own death.

The novel led to Gee appearing in the Granta Best of Young British Novelists list for 1983. Although in a 2012 interview Maggie Gee says that 'I see it as partly luck – the novel came out in July when nothing much was published then, the first review was a rave in The Observer, then The Times ran an extract and everyone fell into line, because critics are easily influenced.

In a 1997 interview Gee admits: "I was 25 when I wrote that book, and I suppose I had more of an exhibitionist streak at that age. I had such fun with the playfulness. As I got older I realised that being categorized as experimental, although it gets you lots of review space, is death; also that you can frighten a lot of readers off."

Plot introduction
The novel concerns the death of Moira Penny, a postgraduate literature student in Oxford, whose naked body is found outside her apartment. But Moira Penny is also writing a novel about the death of an author. The narrative is circular in nature and "snakes through the minds of assorted people as they react to Moira's demise".

Reception
Kirkus Reviews concludes that "Some of this material is - even if read as partial parody - stale and stagey. It certainly doesn't add up satisfyingly, with or without reference to the metafictional framework. But, page by page, Gee demonstrates promise as an ironic observer and darkly lyrical maker of vignettes - talents which would show up far better in a more straightforward, less cutely 'literary' novel'."

References

1981 British novels
Novels about writers
English Gothic novels
Novels set in Oxford
Self-reflexive novels
1981 debut novels